Hōkūlea is a performance-accurate waa kaulua, a Polynesian double-hulled voyaging canoe. Launched on 8 March 1975 by the Polynesian Voyaging Society, it is best known for its 1976 Hawaii to Tahiti voyage completed with exclusively traditional navigation techniques. The primary goal of the voyage was to explore the anthropological theory of the Asiatic origin of native Oceanic people (Polynesians and Hawaiians in particular) as the result of purposeful trips through the Pacific, as opposed to passive drifting on currents or sailing from the Americas. DNA analysis supports this theory. A secondary project goal was to have the canoe and voyage "serve as vehicles for the cultural revitalization of Hawaiians and other Polynesians."

Between the 1976 voyage and 2009, Hōkūle‘a completed  additional voyages to Micronesia, Polynesia, Japan, Canada and the mainland United States, all using ancient wayfinding techniques of celestial navigation. On 19 January 2007, Hōkūle‘a left Hawaii with the voyaging canoe Alingano Maisu on a voyage through Micronesia (map) and ports in southern Japan. The voyage was expected to take five months. On 9 June 2007, Hōkūle‘a completed the "One Ocean, One People" voyage to Yokohama, Japan. On April 5, 2009, Hōkūle‘a returned to Honolulu following a roundtrip training sail to Palmyra Atoll, undertaken to develop skills of potential crewmembers for Hōkūle‘a's eventual circumnavigation of the earth.

On May 18, 2014, Hōkūle‘a and its sister vessel, Hikianalia embarked from Oahu for "Malama Honua," a three-year circumnavigation of the earth. It returned to port in Hawaii on June 17, 2017. The journey covered 47,000 nautical miles with stops at 85 ports in 26 countries.

In between voyages, Hōkūle‘a is moored at the Marine Education Training Center (METC) of Honolulu Community College in Honolulu Harbor.

Construction
Polynesian voyaging canoes were made from wood, whereas Hōkūle‘a incorporates plywood, fiberglass and resin. Hōkūle‘a measures  LOA,  at beam, displaces  when empty and can carry another  of gear, supplies and 12 to 16 crew. Its twin masts are rigged either crab claw or Marconi style with a small jib. It is steered with a long paddle. It has no auxiliary motor. Its escort vessel tows it into harbor when necessary. Its name means "star of gladness" in Hawaiian, which refers to Arcturus, a guiding zenith star for Hawaiian navigators. Arcturus passes directly overhead at Hawaii's latitude, helping sailors find the island.

Pius "Mau" Piailug
Hōkūle‘a navigates without instruments. In 1975, no living Hawaiian knew the ancient techniques for blue water voyaging. To enable the voyage, the Polynesian Voyaging Society recruited the Satawalese Master Navigator Mau Piailug (of the Weriyeng school in the Caroline Islands (map) of the Federated States of Micronesia (map)) to share his knowledge of non-instrument navigation. While as many as six Micronesian navigators had mastered these traditional methods as of the mid-1970s, only Mau was willing to share his knowledge.

Mau, who "barely spoke English", decided that by reaching beyond his own culture, sharing what had been closely guarded knowledge, he could possibly save it from extinction. Through this collaboration, Mau's mentorship helped "spark pride in the Hawaiian and Polynesian culture", leading to "a renaissance of voyaging, canoe building, and non-instrument navigation that has continued to grow, spreading across Polynesia (map) and reaching to its far corners of Aotearoa, New Zealand and Rapanui, Easter Island".

Voyages

Inaugural voyage (1976) 

Led by Captain Elia David Kuualoha "Kawika" Kapahulehua* and Navigator Pius "Mau" Piailug, a Carolinian master navigator.*, Hōkūlea departed Honolua Bay, Maui, Hawaii for Papeete, Tahiti, (voyage map) as part of the celebration of the United States Bicentennial. Mau navigated from Hawaii to Tahiti without instruments. Due to a conflict between crew members which escalated into physical violence, Mau abruptly returned home to Micronesia after reaching Tahiti. Hōkūleʻa had to be navigated back using western instruments (compass, nautical charts, sextant, chronometer, dividers, parallel rulers, pencil, nautical almanac).

On board the inaugural voyage was Hoku, a golden hair Hawaiian Poi Dog backbred by Jack L. Throp of the Honolulu Zoo. Razor-backed pigs and Polynesian chickens were also bred at the zoo for the voyage, but the director would not part with them at the last minute. Instead, the voyage hurriedly brought a white domesticated pig from Kōkeʻe, Kauai named Maxwell, and a cock and hen. The purpose of the animals was to study how to feed and care for these animals, which had been transported by the Polynesians during their voyages.

 Honolua Bay, Maui, Hawaii (map),  – Papeete, Tahiti (map), Society Islands (map),  (map) 1 May 1976 to 4 June 1976
 The crew for this leg was as follows:'Navigator: Mau Piailug; Captain: "Kawika" Kapahulehua; Crew: Clifford Ah Mow*, Milton "Shorty" Bertelmann, Ben R. Finney, Charles Tommy Holmes*, Sam Kalalau*, Boogie Kalama, Buffalo Keaulana, John Kruse, Douglas "Dukie" Kuahulu*, David Henry Lewis*, David B. K. "Dave" Lyman III*, William "Billy" Richards, Rodo Tuku Williams.*
 Papeete, Tahiti,  – Hawaii,  5 July 1976 to 26 July 1976
 The crew for the return voyage was: Navigator: James "Kimo" Lyman; Captain: "Kawika" Kapahulehua; Crew: Abraham "Snake" Ah Hee, Andy Espirto*, Mel Kinney, Francis Kainoa Lee, Gordon Piianaia, Leonard Puputauiki, Penny Rawlins, Keani Reiner*, Charles Nainoa "Nainoa" Thompson, Maka'ala Yates, Ben Young.

Kealaikahiki project (1977) 

In English, the Hawaiian "Ke ala i kahiki" means "the path to Tahiti." The "Kealaikahiki Project" recreated the traditional Kealaikahiki Point departure of ancient voyages to Tahiti. Gordon Piianaia's idea to recreate traditional departures took Hōkūlea southeast, across Kealaikahiki Channel between Lānai and Kahoolawe Islands, past Kealaikahiki Point, into the Alenuihāhā Channel and the northeast trade winds. The object was to determine whether Hōkūlea, departing from west of the 1976 departure point, would bisect the more easterly 1976 voyage track, and so likely reach Tahiti were it to continue. After heading south for two days, Hōkūlea did not bisect the 1976 voyage track, but likely would have (further south than anticipated). It came about and returned to Hawaii. The traditional departure point would be used for subsequent sailings to Tahiti.

Legs 
 Honolulu, Oahu – Manele Bay, Lānai – Kealaikahiki Point, Kahoolawe, Hawaii (map),  – a point at sea, ninety miles south of Ka Lae, Hawaii Island – Honolulu, Hawaii, : 1 April 1977 to 10 April 1977

Crew
Navigator: Nainoa Thompson; Captain: Dave Lyman; Crew: Teené Froiseth, Sam Kaai, Sam Kalalau, John Kruse, "Kimo" Lyman, Jerome "Jerry" Muller, Gordon Piianaia, Norman Piianaia, Michael A. Tongg*, Makaala Yates

Tahiti voyage (1978) 

Following the 1976 voyage, Nainoa Thompson attempted to teach himself how to navigate without instruments, using only the position of stars and ocean cues, based on information he learned from books, planetarium observations, and short voyages in Hawaiian waters. In 1978, the crew of Hōkūlea attempted a second voyage to Tahiti, which was aborted when Hōkūlea capsized in high wind and seas southwest of the Island of Molokai, five hours after departing Honolulu's Ala Wai Harbor. The crew hung on to the capsized canoe through the night. Flares were unseen by passing aircraft; the emergency radio reached no help. By mid-morning, with no sign of imminent rescue and the capsized canoe drifting farther from land, Eddie Aikau, a North Shore, Oahu, lifeguard of the year, 1977 Duke Kahanamoku champion and big-wave surfer, valiantly attempted to paddle a surfboard  to Lānai for help. About nine hours later, flares launched by the crew were spotted by a Hawaiian Airlines flight which circled Hōkūlea and radioed the United States Coast Guard ("USCG"). Half an hour later, a USCG search and rescue helicopter was hovering overhead; Hōkūlea crew was rescued. The following morning, the  towed the vessel, from 22 miles southwest of Lāau Point, Molokai, back to Honolulu. Despite intensive land, air and sea search, Eddie Aikau was never seen again. Hōkūlea carries a plaque in his memory. Subsequent voyages were accompanied by an escort vessel.

Ala Wai Harbor, Honolulu, Hawaii,  bound for Papeete, Tahiti, : 16 March 1978 to 18 March 1978 (recovery followed by USCG investigation) 
Navigator: Nainoa Thompson; Captain: Dave Lyman; First Mate: Leon Paoa Sterling*; "Snake" Ah Hee, Edward Ryon Makua Hanai "Eddie" Aikau*, Charman Akina, M.D., Wedemeyer Au, Bruce Blankenfeld, Kilila Hugho, Sam Kaai, John Kruse, Marion Lyman, Buddy McGuire, Norman Piianaia, Curt Sumida, Teikiheepo "Tava" Taupu.

Tahiti voyage (1980) 

After the 1978 disaster, Mau returned and gave Nainoa further training on traditional navigation techniques. In 1980, Nainoa Thompson recreated the 1976 voyage to Tahiti to become the first Native Hawaiian in modern times to navigate a canoe thousands of miles without instruments. Mau sailed as an observer. After 29 days at sea, before sighting Mataiva on the way to Tahiti, Mau offered Nainoa only one correction; of Nainoa's interpretation of sighting a land-based seabird in mid-morning flight. Such birds generally fly seaward for food at morning and return to land in the evening. While it can usually be assumed that land lies opposite the birds' morning flight direction, this bird spotted mid-morning (during nesting season), carried a fish in its beak. This detail suggested to Mau that the bird's morning flight was not away from land but toward it. The bird was not flying seaward to find more fish, but rather, was returning to land, to feed its young. Leading up to the voyage, an extensive, formal crew training program helped to ensure a safe voyage. Escort boat Ishka followed for safety.

Hilo, Hawaii Island,  – Papeete, Tahiti, Society Islands, : 15 March 1980 to 17 April 1980 
Navigator: Nainoa Thompson; Captain: Gordon Piianaia; Chad Kalepa Baybayan, "Shorty" Bertelmann, Harry Ho, Sam Kaai, Michael "Buddy" McGuire, Marion Lyman-Mersereau, Mau Piailug, Steve Somsen, Joanne Kahanamoku Sterling*, Leon Paoa Sterling, "Tava" Taupu; Patrick Koon Hung Piimauna Charles "Pat" Aiu, MD*

Papeete, Tahiti,  – Honolulu, Hawaii, : 13 May 1980 to 6 June 1980 
Navigator: Nainoa Thompson; Captain: Gordon Piianaia; Wedemeyer Au, Chad Baybayan, Bruce Blankenfeld, "Snake" Ah Hee, John Kruse, Kainoa Lee, James "Kimo" Lyman, Mau Piailug, Steven Somsen, Leon Paoa Sterling, Michael Tongg, Nathan Wong

Voyage of Rediscovery (1985–1987) 

In the "Voyage of Rediscovery", Hōkūlea traveled  to destinations throughout Polynesia. Inviting fellow Polynesians to join the crew on legs of the voyage extended Hōkūlea's success in revitalizing interest in Polynesian culture. For instance, professional Tongan sea captain Sione Taupeamuhu was aboard during a night passage from Tongatapu to Nomuka in the northerly Haapai Islands group of Tonga (map). He was skeptical that Hōkūlea navigator Nainoa Thompson could find Nomuka without instruments. When Nomuka appeared on the horizon at dawn as anticipated, Taupeamuhu remarked, "Now I can believe the stories of my ancestors." Dorcas and Maalea served as escort vessels.

Hawaii Island,  – Papeete, Society Islands, : 10 July 1985 to 11 August 1985 
Navigator: Nainoa Thompson; Captain: "Shorty" Bertelmann; Crew: Clay Bertelmann*, Dennis Chun, Richard Tai Crouch, Harry Ho, Dr. Larry Magnussen, "Buddy" McGuire, Mau Piailug, Thomas Reity (Satawal), James Shizuru, "Tava" Taupu

Papeete, Tahiti,  – Rarotonga,  (map): 30 August 1985 to 14 September 1985 
Navigator: Nainoa Thompson; Captain: Gordon Piianaia; Crew: "Snake" Ah Hee, Dr. Pat Aiu, Chad Baybayan, Karim Cowan (Tahiti), Bob Krauss, John Kruse, Vic Lipman, Mel Paoa, Mau Piailug, Abraham Piianaia, Chad Piianaia, Michael Tongg, Andrew Tutai (Cook Islands), Peter Sepelalur (Satawal), Leon Paoa Sterllng, Puaniho Tauotaha (Tahiti), Cliff Watson. (Bob Krauss, journalist; Karim Cowan, and Puaniho Tauotaha were crew members only from Tahiti to Raiatea)

Rarotonga,  – Waitangi, North Island,  (map): 21 November  1985 to 7 December 1985 
Navigator: Nainoa Thompson; Captain and 1st Watch Captain: "Shorty" Bertelmann; 2nd Watch Captain: Leon Paoa Sterling; 3rd Watch Captain: "Tava" Taupu (Marquesas); Crew: Dr. Pat Aiu, Chad Baybayan, Bruce Blankenfeld, Stanley Conrad (New Zealand), Dr. Ben Finney, Harry Ho, "Buddy" McGuire, "Billy" Richards, James Shizuru, Michael Tongg

Waitangi,  – Nukualofa, Tongatapu Island, Kingdom of  : 1 May 1986 to 11 May 1986 
Navigator: Nainoa Thompson; Captain: Leon Paoa Sterling; Crew: "Snake" Ah Hee, Dr. Pat Aiu, Carlos Andrade, Chad Baybayan, Philip Ikeda*, John Keolanui, "Kimo" Lyman, Mau Piailug, Scott Sullivan, Michael Tongg, Sione Uaine Ula (Tonga)

Nukualofa,  – Pago Pago, Tutuila Island,  (map): 23 May 1986 to 25 May 1986 
Navigator: Nainoa Thompson; Captain: Leon Paoa Sterling; Crew: Dr. Pat Aiu, Carlos Andrade, Gilbert Ane, Gail Evenari (California), Chad Baybayan, Hector Busby (New Zealand), Philip Ikeda*, Sam Kaai, John Keolanui, "Kimo" Lyman, Mau Piailug, Scott Sullivan, Jo Anne Sterling, Sione Taupeamuhu (Tonga), Michael Tongg, Sione Uaine Ula (Tonga)

Ofu Island,  – Aitutaki, : 7 July 1986 to 16 July 1986 
Navigator: Nainoa Thompson; Captain: "Shorty" Bertelmann; Crew: Clay Bertelmann, Harry Ho, Pauahi Ioane, Bernard Kilonsky, Ben Lindsey, Mel Paoa, Mau Piailug, Tua Pittman (Cook Islands), "Tava" Taupu (Marquesas)

Aitutaki – Rarotonga: 10 August 1986 to 11 August 1986 
Navigator and Captain: Nainoa Thompson; Crew: Dr. Pat Aiu, Chad Baybayan, Dede Bertelmann, Bruce Blankenfeld, "Wally" Froseith, Pauahi Ioane, "Jerry" Muller, Mau Piailug, Tua Pittman (Rarotonga), Rio Tuiravakai (Aitutaki), Raukete Tuiravakai (Aitutaki)

Rarotonga,  – Tautira, Tahiti Iti, Society Islands, : 12 August 1986 to 21 August 1986 
Navigator and Captain: Nainoa Thompson; Crew: "Snake" Ah Hee, Dr. Pat Aiu, Chad Baybayan, Bruce Blankenfeld, Wallace "Wally" Froiseth, Harry Ho, Glen Oshiro, Mau Piailug, Richard Rhodes, Michael Tongg, Aaron Young

Tautira – Papeete, Tahiti Nui – Tautira: 27 March 1987 to 29 March 1987 
Navigator and Captain: Nainoa Thompson; Crew: U.S. Senator Daniel Akaka, Chad Baybayan; "Wally" Froiseth, Harry Ho, Kilo Kaina, Michele Kapana, Will Kyselka, Russell Mau, Honolulu City Councilman Arnold Morgado; Abraham Piianaia, Tutaha Salmon (Tahiti), Cary Sneider (California), "Tava" Taupu (Marquesas), Michael Tongg, Aaron Young. Senator Akaka and Councilman Morgado joined the crew in Papeete.

Tautira, Tahiti Iti, Society Islands – Rangiroa Atoll, Tuamotus (map): 2 April 1987 to 4 April 1987 
Navigator and Captain: Nainoa Thompson; Crew; Chad Baybayan, Clay Bertelmann, "Wally" Froiseth, Rey Jonsson, Solomon Kahoohalahala, Will Kyselka, Charles Larson, Mel Paoa, Cary Sneider (California), "Tava" Taupu, Tracy Tong, Michael Tongg, Clifford Watson, Dr. Nathan Wong, Elisa Yadao, Aaron Young

Rangiroa, Tuamotus,  – Kualoa, Oahu (map), Hawaii, : 24 April 1987 to 23 May 1987. 
Navigator: Nainoa Thompson; Captain: "Shorty" Bertelmann; Crew: "Snake" Ah Hee, Dr. Pat Aiu, Chad Baybayan, Bruce Blankenfeld, Stanley Conrad (New Zealand), Eni Hunkin (Samoa), Tua Pittman (Cook Islands), Dixon Stroup, Puaniho Tauotaha (Tahiti), Sione Taupeamuhu (Tonga), "Tava" Taupu (Marquesas), Michael Tongg, Clifford Watson, Elisa Yadao

No Nā Mamo ('For the Children') (1992)

Hōkūlea sailed to Tahiti, Raiatea, and on to Rarotonga for the Sixth Festival of Pacific Arts, then, via Tahiti, sailed back to Hawaii. This voyage, known as "No Nā Mamo" or "For the Children", was designed to train a new generation of voyagers to sail Hōkūlea, to share values and knowledge of voyaging and to celebrate the revival of canoe building and non-instrument navigation. The voyage included an educational component allowing Hawaiian students to track the progress of the canoe through daily radio reports. Kama Hele escorted the voyage.

Honaunau, Hawaii Island,  – Papeete, Tahiti, Society Islands, : 17 June 1992 to 15 July 1992 
Crew: Nainoa Thompson, Sailing master; Chad Baybayan, Co-navigator; "Shorty" Bertelmann, Co-navigator; Clay Bertelmann, Captain; Nailima Ahuna, Fisherman; Dennis J. Chun, Historian; Maulili Dixon, Cook; Kainoa Lee; Liloa Long; Jay Paikai; Chadd Kaonohi Paishon; Ben Tamura, M.D.; "Tava" Taupu

Papeete – Raiatea: 10 September 1992 to 16 September 1992 
Crew: Nainoa Thompson, Sailing master; Chad Baybayan, Navigator; Keahi Omai, Navigator; "Billy" Richards, Captain; Gilbert Ane; John Eddy, Film Documentation; Clement "Tiger" Espere*; Brickwood Galuteria, Communications; Harry Ho; Sol Kahoohalahala; Dennis Kawaharada, Communications; Reggie Keaunui; Keone Nunes, Oral Historian; Eric Martinson; Nalani Minton, Traditional Medicine; Esther Mookini, Hawaiian Language; Mel Paoa; Cliff Watson, Film Documentation; Nathan Wong, M.D.

Raiatea, Society Islands,  – Mauke,  – Aitutaki – Rarotonga: 20 September 1992 to 16 October 1992 
Crew: Nainoa Thompson, Sailing master; Chad Baybayan, Navigator; Gordon Piianaia, Captain; Moana Doi, Photo Documentation; John Eddy, Film Documentation; Ben Finney, Scholar; "Wally" Froseith, Watch Captain; Brickwood Galuteria, Communications; Harry Ho; Kaau McKenney; Keahi Omai; Keone Nunes, Oral Historian; "Billy" Richards, Watch Captain; Cliff Watson, Film Documentation
Cook Islands Additional Crew: Clive Baxter (Aitutaki); Tura Koronui (Atiu); Dorn Marsters (Aitutaki); Tua Pittman (Rarotonga); Nga Pouao (Mitiaro); Maara Tearaua (Mangaia); Peia Tuaati (Mauke)

Rarotonga,  – Papeete, Tahiti, Society Islands,  – Honaunau, Hawaii Island, : 26 October 1992 to 1 December 1992 
Co-navigators: Bruce Blankenfeld, "Kimo" Lyman; Captain: Michael Tongg; Sailing Master: Nainoa Thompson; Watch Captain and Cook: "Snake" Ah Hee; Watch Captain: Aaron Young; Ship's Doctor: Pat Aiu, M.D; Historian: Carlos Andrade; Fisherman: Terry Hee; Communications: Scott Sullivan; Crew: Archie Kalepa, Suzette Smith, Wallace Wong, Gary Yuen

Nā ʻOhana Holo Moana ('The Voyaging Families of the Vast Ocean') (1995)

Spring voyage segment 
In the spring, Hōkūlea, along with sister ships Hawai‘iloa and Makali‘i, sailed from Hawaii to Tahiti. They participated in a gathering of voyaging canoes from across Oceania at nearby Marae Taputapuatea, Raiatea, which led to the lifting of a six-centuries-old tapu on voyaging from Raiatea. Then all the canoes returned to Tahiti, sailed to Nuku Hiva in the Marquesas and on to Hawaii. This was only the first part of a voyage spanning spring and summer known as "Nā Ohana Holo Moana" or The Voyaging Families of the Vast Ocean. Hōkūlea was escorted by Gershon II under Steve Kornberg; Rizaldar, under Randy Wichman, also escorted.

Hilo, Hawaii Island,  – Papeete, Tahiti, Society Islands, : 11 February 1995 to 4 March 1995 
Sailing Master: Nainoa Thompson; Navigators: Kaau McKenney, Keahi Omai; Crew: Shantell Ching, Junior Coleman, Catherine Fuller, Harry Ho, Mau Piailug, Sesario Sewralur (son of Mau Piailug), Ben Tamura, MD; "Tava" Taupu, Michael Tongg, Kamaki Worthington. After Hōkūlea sighted Tikehau on 2 March 1995, Navigators Kaau McKenney and Keahi Omai turned over navigation to their apprentices, Junior Coleman and Sesario Sewralur, who guided the vessel to landfall in Papeete, Tahiti.

Tautira, Tahiti – Fare, Huahine – Marae Taputapuatea, Raiatea – Tahaa – Tautira, Tahiti: 16 March 1995 to 24 March 1995 
The crew may be the same as on the previous leg, but this is speculation.

Tautira, Tahiti, Society Islands – Taiohae Bay, Nuku Hiva, Marquesas Islands: 6 April 1995 to 15 April 1995 
Navigator and Captain: Chad Baybayan;

Taiohae Bay, Nuku Hiva, Marquesas,  – Hilo, Hawaii Island, : 20 April 1995 to 7 May 1995 
Navigator and Captain: Chad Baybayan; Co-assistant navigators: Moana Doi, Piikea Miller; Watch Captains: "Snake" Ah Hee, "Tava" Taupu, Michael Tongg; Medical Officer: Mel Paoa; Fisherman and Teacher: Nainoa Thompson; Cook: Gary Yuen; Crew: Clyde Aikau, Sam Pautu, Mau Piailug, Sesario Sewralur, Gary Suzuki

Summer voyage segment 
In the summer: Hōkūlea and Hawai‘iloa sailed the West Coast of the United States. Both vessels were shipped from Hawaii to Seattle, Washington, after which they sailed to Vancouver, British Columbia. They visited intermediate ports, where local American Indian tribes often hosted them to a dinner and gift exchange. From Vancouver, Hawai‘iloa sailed as far north as Haines, Alaska. Hōkūlea sailed south to San Diego via Portland, Oregon, and the California ports of San Francisco, Santa Barbara, and Long Beach. The voyaging canoes were shipped back to Hawaii: Hōkūlea from San Pedro; Hawai‘iloa from Seattle. This summer part of the voyage promoted cultural and educational exchanges with Hawaiians (some of whom had never been to Hawaii), Native Americans, and other people living on the United States West Coast.

Crew: Captains: Gordon Piianaia, "Kimo" Lyman, Michael Tongg, Chad Baybayan; Crew: Gil Ane, Beth Atuatasi (née Saurer), Moana Doi, Laulima Lyman, Leon Sterling, Matthew Tongg

Stops in the Puget Sound and Straits of Georgia and Juan de Fuca area 
Hōkūlea visited:
 Pier 57, Seattle, Washington, : 19 May 1995 to 26 May 1995Hōkūlea crew participated in National Maritime Week festivities and shared a dinner hosted by the Muckleshoot, Puyallup, Suquamish nations and Wayfinders of the Pacific.
 Golden Gardens, Shilshole Bay: 27 May 1995 to 28 May 1995A potlatch with First Nations was shared with hoolaulea (celebration); Hōkūlea supported the Polynesian Youth Games hosted by Seattle Parks and Recreation
 Chinook Landing Marina, Puyallup Nation, Tacoma: 28 May 1995 to 1 June 1995As well as sharing educational outreach and cultural exchange, crew shared in a luau.
 Suquamish Reservation: 1 June 1995 to 2 June 1995
 Lummi Nation, Bellingham: 3 June 1995 to 4 June 1995
 Squalicum Harbor, Bellingham: 5 June 1995
 Swinomish Reservation, Skagit, Washington, : 6 June 1995
 Vancouver Maritime Museum, Vancouver, British Columbia, : 7 June 1995 to 8 June 1995Exchange with the Assembly of First Nations
 Makah Nation, Neah Bay, Washington, : 9 June 1995 to 11 June 1995

Neah Bay – Portland, Oregon: 12 June 1995 to 15 June 1995; Columbia River 
Hōkūlea visited:
 Kalama, Washington where crew shared a dinner with Kalama Ohana: 16 June 1995
 Fort Vancouver, Washington public dock where Hōkūlea was part of a festival and the rededication of Kanaka Village: 17 June 1995 to 20 June 1995

Portland, Oregon – San Francisco, California: 21 June 1995 to 29 June 1995 
Hōkūlea visited:
 Hyde Street Pier arrival for 1 July 1995 welcoming ceremony and festival at Crissy Field, 2 July 1995 Long Boat Regatta on the bay, Hawaiian music concert and Polynesian festival at Lawrence Hall of Science.

San Francisco – Santa Barbara: 3 July 1995 to 9 July 1995 
Hōkūlea visited:
 Santa Barbara Harbor Marina: 10 July 1995 to 11 July 1995, interchange with the Santa Barbara Outrigger Canoe Club, Cousteau Institute, and the Santa Barbara Museum of Natural History

Santa Barbara – Long Beach: 11 July 1995 to 12 July 1995 
Hōkūlea visited:
 Gabrieleño/Tongva Tribal Council, Kalifornia Outrigger Association, Hawaiian Civic Clubs, the Rapa Nui Outrigger Club, and the City of Long Beach, on 12 July 1995;
 A two-day symposium with scholars, scientists, and master artisans called Century of the Pakipika, 13 July 1995 to 14 July 1995;
 A Hawaiian and Pacific Island Festival with teachers' workshops, the annual Long Beach Hoolaulea Canoe Regatta and a farewell dinner and ceremonies, 13 July 1995 to 19 July 1995

Long Beach – San Diego: 20 July 1995 
Hōkūlea visited:
 Embarcadero, San Diego, there was a welcoming ceremony, 22 July 1995,
 A Hawaiian and Pacific Islands festival, and an exhibition, called:
 Hale Naua, or "Turning Back the Sky," at the San Diego Museum of Man, 23 July 1995 to 25 July 1995

San Diego – San Pedro: 26 July 1995 to 28 July 1995; from San Pedro, Hōkūlea returned to Hawaii by ship, courtesy of Alexander & Baldwin Foundation and Matson.

Closing the Triangle (1999–2000) 

Hōkūlea sailed from Hawaii to Rapa Nui (Easter Island) and back, via the Marquesas Islands of French Polynesia. While in the Marquesas, short trips were made between principal islands of the group (map). A brief stop was made at Pitcairn Island on the Mangareva – Rapa Nui leg. A technically challenging voyage due to Rapa Nui's isolation and location over 1,000 miles upwind; it is known as "Closing the Triangle" because it took the canoe to the southeastern Pacific for the first time. Kama Hele escorted the voyage.

,  Island,  – Nuku Hiva, Marquesas Islands, : 15 June 1999 to 13 July 1999 
Navigator and Captain: Bruce Blankenfeld; Apprentice Navigator: Piikea Miller; Watch Captains: Dennis Chun, Terry Hee, Leon Paoa Sterling; Crew: Russell Amimoto, Desmon Antone, Darcy Attisani, Kekama Helm, Kaau McKenney, Atwood Makanani, Hauoli Smith, Wallace Wong

Nuku Hiva – Ua Pou – Ua Huka – Tahuata – Fatu Hiva – Hiva Oa – Mangareva, Gambier Islands: 2 August 1999 to 29 August 1999 
Navigator and Captain: Chad Baybayan; Apprentice Navigators: Moana Doi, Catherine Fuller; Student Navigator: Aldon Kim; Watch Captains: Terry Hee, Mel Paoa, "Tava" Taupu; Protocol Officer: Kaniela Akaka; Crew: Tim Gilliom, Kealoha Hoe, Aeronwy Polo, Mona Shintani, Gary Suzuki, Nalani Wilson, Gary Yuen

Mangareva,  – Pitcairn,  – Rapa Nui  (Easter Island), Territory of : 21 September 1999 to 9 October 1999 
Navigator and Captain: Nainoa Thompson; Navigators: Bruce Blankenfeld, Chad Baybayan; Medical Officer: Ben Tamura, MD; Photographer and Videographer: Sonny Ahuna; Crew: Shantell Ching, Terry Hee, Mel Paoa, "Tava" Taupu, Michael Tongg, Max Yarawamai, Aaron Young

Rapa Nui  (Easter Island), Territory of  – Tahiti, : 9 November 1999 to 3 December 1999 
Navigator: Bruce Blankenfeld; Captain: "Wally" Froiseth; Crew: Naalehu Anthony, Bob Bee, Blane Chong, Dennis Chun, Terry Hee, Nalani Kaneakua, Kawika Crivello, Kealoha Hoe, "Kimo" Lyman, Kawai Warren, Kamaki Worthington

Tahiti,  – Kaunakakai, Molokai, Hawaii, : 5 February 2000 to 27 February 2000 
Navigator: Nainoa Thompson; Navigator: Shantell Ching; Crew: "Snake" Ah Hee, Chad Baybayan, Pomaikalani "Pomai" Bertelmann, Bruce Blankenfeld, Sam Low, Joey Mallot, Kahualaulani Mick, Kaiulani Murphy, Kaui Pelekane, "Tava" Taupu, Michael Tongg, Dr. Patrice Ming-Lei Tim Sing, Kona Woolsey

Navigating Change (2003–2004) 

In 2003, Hōkūlea sailed to Nihoa, the closest of the "leeward," or Northwestern Hawaiian Islands (maps: small and large scale), to set the stage for the 2004 voyage to the furthest, most westerly of them, Kure Atoll. Hōkūlea's 2004 voyage took the canoe through the area now comprising the Papahānaumokuākea Marine National Monument to promote stewardship and awareness of this area. Hōkūlea participated in an interagency initiative with this voyage named after it, called "Navigating Change". Upon reaching the remote islands, the crew helped remove hundreds of pounds of washed-up fishing nets that threatened Hawaiian monk seals and Hawaiian Green sea turtles and also helped with plant conservation. About 1,600 schoolchildren linked to the vessel by daily satellite phone calls. Teachers prepared with curriculum guides, video and web resources. Navigating Change was supported by US Fish & Wildlife Service, Polynesian Voyaging Society, Bishop Museum, NOAA, Hawai'i Department of Education, Hawai'i Department of Land and Natural Resources, Hawaii Maritime Center, University of Hawaii, The Nature Conservancy, Western Pacific Regional Fishery Management Council, Coastal Zone Management Hawaii, National Fish and Wildlife Foundation, Harold K.L. Castle Foundation and the Pacific American Foundation. Kama Hele escorted the voyage.

Oahu – Kauai: 7 September 2003 to ? 
Captain: Bruce Blankenfeld; Crew: Carey Amimoto, Anela Benson, Leimomi Dierks, Timmy Gilliom, Kiki Hugho, Nohea Kaiaokamalie, Jerry Muller, Dean Nikaido, Mel Paoa, Ronson Sahut, Jan TenBruggencate, Boyd Yap

Kauai – Nihoa: 9 September 2003 to ? 
Captain: Nainoa Thompson; Crew: Russell Amimoto, Naalehu Anthony, Bruce Blankenfeld, Nohea Kaiaokamalie, Cindy Macfarlane, Mel Paoa, Jan TenBruggencate, Kana Uchino, Alex Wegman, Aulani Wilhelm

Harbor, Hawaii – , Kauai: 2 May 2004 to 3 May 2004 
Navigator: Kaiulani Murphy; Captain: Russell Amimoto; Crew: Jan TenBruggencate,

Bay, Kauai – Nihoa Island – Tern Island, French Frigate Shoals – Laysan Island – Lisianski Island – Pearl and Hermes Atoll – Green Island, Kure Atoll – Midway Atoll: 23 May 2004 to 9 June 2004 
Navigator: Kaiulani Murphy; Captain: Nainoa Thompson; Sailing Master: Bruce Blankenfeld; Watch Captain: Russell Amimoto; Crew: Naalehu Anthony, Ann Bell; Leimomi Kekina Dierks, Randy Kosaki, Keoni Kuoha, Cherie Shehata, MD, "Tava" Taupu, Jan TenBruggencate, Kanako Uchino, Kaleo Wong

Midway Atoll – : 11 June 2004 to 22 June 2004 
Navigator: Bruce Blankenfeld; Captain: Mel Paoa; Terry Hee, Kealoha Hoe, Nohea Kaiaokamalie, Keoni Kuoha, Kaiulani Murphy, "Tava" Taupu, Mike Taylor, Gary Yuen

Captain: Russell Amimoto; Gerald Aikau

One Ocean, One People (2007) 

The One Ocean, One People theme united two voyages in celebration of Pacific voyaging, Pacific Islands, and cultural ties, in passages to Micronesia and Japan. These voyages were named Kū Holo Mau and Kū Holo Lā Komohana. Kama Hele escorted the voyage.

Kū Holo Mau 
Accompanied by the canoe Alingano Maisu and specialized escort boat Kama Hele, (photo below, in gallery) Hōkūlea sailed from Hawaii to the Federated States of Micronesia, 23 January to 7 April 2007. This voyage is known as "Kū Holo Mau", or "Sail On, Sail Always, Sail Forever." While on the island of Satawal, the crew of the Hōkūlea presented the Alingano Maisu to Mau Piailug. While at Satawal, some Hōkūlea navigators who had proven their mastery of non-instrument sailing and navigation over many ocean passages were inducted into Pwo, pronounced "poh." This was the first Pwo ceremony on Satawal in five decades, and the first time Polynesians were inducted.

Kawaihae, Hawaii Island,  – Majuro, Republic of the : 23 January 2007 to 18 February 2007 
Navigator and Captain: Bruce Blankenfeld; Watch Captains: Tim Gilliom, Attwood Makanani, Kaiulani Murphy; Medical Officer: Dr. Ben Tamura; Crew: Russell Amimoto, Bob Bee, Terry Hee, Nohea Kaiokamalie, Kaleo Wong, Palani Wright

, Republic of the  – , : 21 February 2007 to 28 February 2007 
Navigator and Captain: Bruce Blankenfeld; Watch Captains: Tim Gilliom, Attwood Makanani, Kaiulani Murphy; Medical Officer: Dr. Gerald Akaka; Crew: Russell Amimoto, Terry Hee, Nohea Kaiokamalie, Gary Kubota, Kaleo Wong, Palani Wright

Pohnpei – Chuuk: 6 March 2007 to 9 March 2007 
Navigator and Captain: Nainoa Thompson; Watch Captains: Tim Gilliom, Attwood Makanani, Kaiulani Murphy; Medical Officer: Dr. Marjorie Mau; Crew: Naalehu Anthony, Pomai Bertelmann, Gary Kubota, Keoni Kuoha, Nick Marr, "Billy" Richards, Ana Yarawamai, Max Yarawamai, Pauline Yourupi

Chuuk – Satawal, Yap State: 11 March 2007 to 21 March 2007 
Navigator and Captain: Nainoa Thompson; Watch Captains: Tim Gilliom, Attwood Makanani, Kaiulani Murphy; Medical Officer: Dr. Marjorie Mau; Crew: Naalehu Anthony, Chad Baybayan, "Shorty" Bertelmann, Pomai Bertelmann, Bruce Blankenfeld, "Snake" Ah Hee, John Kruse, Gary Kubota, Keoni Kuoha, Nick Marr, "Billy" Richards, Ana Yarawamai, Max Yarawamai, Pauline Yourupi

Satawal – Woleai Atoll: 19 March 2007 to 21 March 2007 
Navigator and Captain: Nainoa Thompson; Watch Captains: Tim Gilliom, Attwood Makanani, Kaiulani Murphy; Medical Officer: Dr. Marjorie Mau; Crew: Naalehu Anthony, Chad Baybayan, "Shorty" Bertelmann, Pomai Bertelmann, Bruce Blankenfeld, "Snake" Ah Hee, John Kruse, Gary Kubota, Keoni Kuoha, Nick Marr, "Billy" Richards, Ana Yarawamai, Max Yarawamai, Pauline Yourupi

Woleai – Ulithi Atoll: 21 March 2007 to 23 March 2007 
Navigator: Kaiulani Murphy; Captain: Nainoa Thompson; Watch Captains: Tim Gilliom, Attwood Makanani; Medical Officer: Dr. Marjorie Mau; Crew: Naalehu Anthony, Chad Baybayan, Pomai Bertelmann, Gary Kubota, Keoni Kuoha, Nick Marr, "Billy" Richards, Ana Yarawamai, Max Yarawamai, Pauline Yourupi

Ulithi – Yap Island: 21 March 2007 to 23 March 2007 
Navigator and Captain: Nainoa Thompson; Watch Captains: Tim Gilliom, Attwood Makanani, Kaiulani Murphy; Medical Officer: Dr. Marjorie Mau; Crew: Naalehu Anthony, Chad Baybayan, Pomai Bertelmann, Bruce Blankenfeld, Dr. Thane Hancock, "Snake" Ah Hee, John Kruse, Gary Kubota, Keoni Kuoha, Nick Marr, "Billy" Richards, Ana Yarawamai, Max Yarawamai, Pauline Yourupi

Colonia, Yap Island,  –  (map): 29 March 2007 to 31 March 2007 
Navigator and Captain: Nainoa Thompson; Watch Captains: Tim Gilliom, Attwood Makanani, Kaiulani Murphy; Medical Officer: Dr. Vernon Andsell; Crew: Aaron Akina, Naalehu Anthony, Pomai Bertelmann, Dennis Eric Co, Emily Fielding, Keoni Kuoha, Waimea McKeague, Tommy Remengesau (President of Palau), Pauline Sato, Patti Ann Solomon, Jennifer Yano

– Colonia, Yap Island, : 5 April 2007 to 7 April 2007 
Navigator: Kaiulani Murphy; Captain: Naalehu Anthony; Watch Captains: Tim Gilliom, Attwood Makanani, Nainoa Thompson; Medical Officer: Dr. Vernon Andsell; Crew: Aaron Akina, Pomai Bertelmann, Dennis Eric Co, Emily Fielding, Keoni Kuoha, Waimea McKeague, Pauline Sato, Patti Ann Solomon

Kū Holo Lā Komohana
From Yap, the Hōkūlea sailed to Yokohama, Japan, from 11 April 2007 to 8 June 2007. Upon sighting Kyūshū, navigation of coastal and inland seas utilized landmarks and aids to navigation. From departure to landfall at Okinawa, Japan, Hōkūlea was guided by Nainoa Thompson. Chad Baybayan then guided the vessel to further stops at Amami, Uto, Nomozaki, Nagasaki, Fukuoka, Shinmoji marina in Moji-ku, Iwaishima and Suō-Ōshima (Ōshima). Nainoa Thompson resumed as captain for stops at Miyajima and Hiroshima (image). Bruce Blankenfeld took over for stops at Uwajima, Muroto, Miura and Kamakura before concluding the voyage in Yokohama. This voyage is known as "Kū Holo Lā Komohana", or Sail On to the Western Sun. While Hōkūlea was shipped back to Honolulu, escort vessel Kama Hele sailed back to Oahu under German Captain Mike Weindl with six Japanese crewmembers.

Yap,  – Okinawa,  11 April 2007 to 23 April 2007 
Navigator and Captain: Nainoa Thompson; Crew: Takuji Araki (Japan), Pomai Bertelmann, Timi Gilliom, Kaina Holomalia, Attwood Makanani, Kaiulani Murphy, Maile Neff, Chadd Kaonohi Paishon, Dr. Pete Roney, Kanaka Uchino (Japan).

Okinawa – Ōshima 28 April 2007 to 19 May 2007 
Captain: Chad Baybayan; Crew: Imaikalani P. Aiu, Takuji Araki, Kalepa "Kala" Baybayan, Stephanie M. Beeby, Anela K. Benson, Dennis J. Chun, Monte Costa, Derek Ferrar, Timmy Gilliom, Heidi K. Guth, Kaimi C. Hermosura, Kiyoko Ikeda, William Keala Kai, Attwood Makanani, Chadd Kaonohi Paishon, Makaala Rawlins, Dr. Cherie L. Shehata, Van K. Warren

Ōshima – Uwajima 26 May 2007 to 27 May 2007 
Navigator and Captain: Nainoa Thompson; Watch Captain: Kaiulani Murphy; Crew: Imaikalani P. Aiu, Takuji Araki, Nanea Baird, Stephanie M. Beeby, Anela K. Benson, Pomai Bertelmann, Dennis J. Chun, Monte Costa, Heidi K. Guth, Kaimi C. Hermosura, Kiyoko Ikeda, William Keala Kai, Attwood Makanani, Chadd Kaonohi Paishon, Dr. Cherie L. Shehata, Sky Takemoto, Kanako Uchino, Van K. Warren

Uwajima – Yokohama 3 June 2007 to 9 June 2007 
Navigator and Captain: Bruce Blankenfeld; Senior Officers: Norman Piianaia, "Tava" Taupu; Watch Captain: Naalehu Anthony; Crew: Takuji Araki, Chris Baird, Dennis Kawaharada, Attwood Makanani, Dr. Cherie L. Shehata, Patti-Ann Solomon; Watch Captain: Kaiulani Murphy; Crew: Pomai Bertelmann, Dean Nikaido, Chadd Kaonohi Paishon, Leighton Tseu (representing the Royal Order of Kamehameha), Kanako Uchino, Kiyotsugu Yoshida (Sunset Films)

Malama Honua (worldwide voyage) (2014–2017)

Legs
 Polynesia, May 2014 – April 2015
 Malama Hawaii: Statewide Sail
 Hawaii – Tahiti
 Tahiti – Samoa
 Apia and Phoenix Islands
 Tutuila to Aotearoa
 Aotearoa I
 [Australia and] Indian Ocean, May 2015 – December 2015
 Including Sydney
 July 2015: Great Barrier Reef
 August 2015: Bali
 September 2015: Mauritius
 November 2015: South Africa
 Atlantic and Caribbean, January 2016 – February 2016
 January 2016 St. Helena, en route to Brazil
 March 2016 US Virgin Islands in the Caribbean
 March 2016 Havana, Cuba
 'N. America & Canada', April 2016 – December 2016
 April 2016 interior waterways of Florida
 April 2016 NASA Kennedy Space Center
 May 2016 Washington, D.C.
 June 2016 New York City
 June 2016 Rhode Island, Connecticut, Massachusetts, New Hampshire and Maine
 July 2016 Mystic Seaport
 July 2016 Martha's Vineyard
 July 2016 Mt Desert, Maine
 August 2016 Nova Scotia and the Bay of Fundy
 September 2016 (Great Lakes journey) Great Lakes and Ontario, Canada.
 September 2016 Glens Falls, NY.
 October 2016 Virginia (Dry docked for maintenance, and on display)
 December 2016 Miami
 December 2016 towards the Panama Canal
 January 2017 'reached Panama this week'
 Pacific Return January 2017 – June 2017
 January 2017 Back in the Pacific after two-day transit through the Panama Canal
 February 2017 Galapagos
 March 2017 Rapa Nui
 April 2017 Tahiti
 June 2017 Hawai‘i: Homecoming
 Homecoming, Magic Island, Oʻahu June 17, 2017.

Images

See also
 Hawaiiloa
 History of the Pacific Islands
 Pacific Islands
 Polynesian navigation
 Experimental archaeology
 Marumaru Atua

Notes

a. 

* Shown at first mention of the crew person's name, denotes this person has died.
 For voyages across the International Date Line, dates shown below are standardized on Hawai‘i time.

Footnotes

References
 
 
  (Archived by WebCite at )

External links

 Brief introduction to navigating by the stars
 Hōkūle‘a – Star of Gladness on YouTube.com, performed by the Hawaiian artist Israel Kamakawiwoole
 Honolulu Advertiser Hōkūle‘a Voyage Special
 Sam Low's Voyages of Awakening, 25 years of Hōkūle‘a'' Polynesian Voyaging Society website
 Hawaiian Voyaging Traditions on Kapi‘olani Community College website
 Hawaiian Voyaging Traditions section on the building, launching of Hōkūle‘a Public Broadcasting Service website for Wayfinders: A Pacific Odyssey, a film about the ancient Polynesian sea voyaging tradition
 Uncle Charlie's personal website on Hōkūle‘a'', by Charles Kauluwehi Maxwell Sr.
 Hōkūle‘a Worldwide Voyage

Polynesian navigation
Experimental archaeology
Hawaii culture
 
Replica ships
Individual sailing vessels
Sailing ships
Training ships of the United States
Symbols of Hawaii
Polynesian navigators
1975 ships
1975 establishments in Hawaii
Voyaging canoes
Tall ships